Sjötorp is a locality situated in Mariestad Municipality, Västra Götaland County, Sweden. It had 494 inhabitants in 2010.

References 

Populated places in Västra Götaland County
Populated places in Mariestad Municipality